Helina trivittata is a fly from the family Muscidae.

Distribution
Great Britain (England only), France and Bulgaria to Fennoscandia, European Siberia.

References

Muscidae
Diptera of Europe
Insects described in 1860
Taxa named by Johan Wilhelm Zetterstedt